plWordNet is a lexico-semantic database of the Polish language. It includes sets of synonymous lexical units (synsets) followed by short definitions. plWordNet serves as a thesaurus-dictionary where concepts (synsets) and individual word meanings (lexical units) are defined by their location in the network of mutual relations, reflecting the lexico-semantic system of the Polish language. plWordNet is also used as one of the basic resources for the construction of natural language processing tools for Polish.

History 
plWordNet is being developed at Wrocław University of Technology as part of CLARIN. The works  have been carried out by The WrocUT Language Technology Group G4.19 since 2005, funded by the Ministry of Science and Higher Education and by the EU.
The thesaurus has been built from the 'ground up' by lexicographers and natural language engineers.   
The first version of plWordNet was published in 2009 – it contained 20,223 lemmas, 26,990 lexical units and 17,695 synsets. Version 4.0 was released in 2018. The most recent version is plWordNet 4.2.

Content 

Currently, plWordNet contains 195k lemmas, 295k lexical units and 228k synsets. It has already outgrown Princeton WordNet with respect to the number of lexical units. 
plWordNet consists of nouns (135k), verbs (21k), adjectives (29k) and adverbs (8k). Each meaning of a given word is a separate lexical unit. Units that represent the same concept, and do not differ significantly in stylistic register, have been combined into synsets - sets of synonyms.
Each lexical unit is assigned to one of the domains (semantic categories), indicating its general meaning. plWordNet domains correspond to Princeton WordNet lexicographers' files.

Semantic categories in plWordNet

Lexical unit description 

Some lexical units are provided with the information about stylistic register, short definition, usage  examples and link to the relevant Wikipedia article.

The most important element defining words meanings are lexico-semantic and derivational relations, which hold between synsets and between lexical units. One synset groups such lexical units, which share the same set of relations. 
Based on the relations assigned to the synsets and units, tools for natural language processing can conclude about meaning of the lemma, which is important for example in word-sense disambiguation.

Selected noun relations 

Polish synsets are connected to the corresponding Princeton WordNet synsets with a set of inter-lingual lexico-semantic relations (such as for instance synonymy, partial synonymy, hyponymy). 91 578 synsets have been mapped so far (which amounts to about 2/3 of plWordNet synsets, among which mainly nouns). The mapping enables the application of plWordNet in machine translation, e.g. in the online service offered by Google Translate. Mapping can be instrumental in leveraging textual analysis tools from English to Polish.

Applications 
plWordNet is available on the open access license, allowing free browsing. It has been made available to the users in the form of an online dictionary, mobile application and web services. 
Some application of plWordNet: 
 constructing and developing tools for automatic language processing, 
 word-sense disambiguation (WSD), 
 automatic classification of texts, 
 machine translation,
 aphasia treatment, 
 Polish-English and English-Polish dictionary,
 Polish language semantic dictionary,
 dictionary of synonyms and thesaurus, 
 dictionary of antonyms.

References 

Databases in Poland
Polish-language mass media